Rabaul Urban LLG is a local-level government (LLG) of East New Britain Province, Papua New Guinea.

Wards
81. Rabaul Town

References

Local-level governments of East New Britain Province